Marcus Bleasdale (born 1968) is a British photojournalist, born in the UK to an Irish family.

Bleasdale's books include One Hundred Years of Darkness (2003), The Rape of a Nation (2009) and The Unravelling (2015).

Life and career
Bleasdale has covered the conflict within the Democratic Republic of Congo since 1998, which was published in his first book One Hundred Years of Darkness. His second book, The Rape of a Nation, addressed the issues of the conflict being fuelled by natural resource exploration and was awarded the Best Photography Book Award in 2009 by Pictures of the Year International in the USA.

His work on human rights and conflict has been exhibited at the United States Senate, US House of Representatives, The United Nations and the Houses of Parliament in the UK and the International Criminal Court in The Hauge.

He works regularly with Human Rights Watch, UNICEF, Médecins Sans Frontières Saint Kizito Orphanage and other NGOs to highlight health and human rights issues in several countries. He works to cover issues underreported by mainstream media. In 2007, Human Rights Watch and the Open Society Institute awarded Bleasdale a grant to continue his work on justice and accountability in the DRC. He is an Enough Project Fellow.

Bleasdale has been one of the few journalists covering the conflict in Central African Republic between 2013 and 2017, documenting the violence for Human Rights Watch alongside their Director of Emergencies, Peter Bouckaert. This has been covered by many publications and news channels, including National Geographic.

He has had his work published in the UK, Europe and the US in Sunday Times Magazine, The Telegraph Magazine, GEO, The New Yorker, Time, Newsweek, National Geographic, Stern, Le Monde, The New York Times, Rolling Stone, Mother Jones (Masthead Photographer), Aftenposten and Die Zeit.

Bleasdale graduated with an MSt in International Relations from Cambridge University and is still documenting human rights issues around the world and working as managing director of Wilstar, a Social Impact Not for Profit based in Oslo, Norway. He lives in Oslo with his wife, Karin Beate, and daughters.

Awards
 2004: UNICEF Photographer of the Year
 2005: Readers Award (with two others), Days Japan International Photojournalism Awards.
 2005: The Olivier Rebbot Award for Best Foreign Reporting
 2005: The Open Society Institute (OSI) Distribution Grant
 2005: Pictures of the Year International (POYi) Magazine Photographer of the Year Award
 2005: The Alexia Foundation for World Peace
 2005: The World Press Photo of the Year
 2007: Human Rights Watch and the Open Society Institute awarded him a grant to continue his work on justice and accountability in the Democratic Republic of the Congo
 2007: The Freedom of Expression Foundation Norway
 2009: Public Prize (Reader's Award) (along with four others), Days Japan International Photojournalism Awards.
 2009: Magazine News Award in POYi
 2010: Anthropographia Award for Photography and Human Rights
 2010: The Hansel Mieth Award
 2010: Best Photography Book Award from POYi
 2011: The Freedom of Expression Norway
 2011: Webby Award for the feature Dear Obama
 2012: Royal Photographic Society Hood Medal for meritorious performance in photography, with particular emphasis on photography for public service.
 2012: Nominated for a News and Documentary Emmy Award with other members of VII Photo Agency for the film Starved For Attention, made for Médecins Sans Frontières.
 2013: Overseas Press Club of America Awards, Feature Photography Award for Last of the Vikings
 2014: World Press Photo, 3rd Prize Contemporary Issues for Last of the Vikings
 2014: Robert Capa Gold Medal from the Overseas Press Club.
 2015: FotoEvidence Book Award for Inferno:Central African Republic.
 2015: W. Eugene Smith Fellowship from the W. Eugene Smith Memorial Fund.

Exhibitions
 Chicago Public Library (2006)
 United States Senate (2009)
 Headquarters of the United Nations, New York (2009)
 Columbia College (2009)
 The Houses of Parliament, UK (2010)
 Pulitzer Center on Crisis Reporting (2012)
 The White House (2012)
 Fotografiska Farming Out of Poverty (2013)
 Christie's London (2015) IMPACT for Human Rights Watch.
The International Criminal Court, The Hauge (2018)
The United Nations Headquarters, New York (2018)
The Venice Biennale (2019)

Books
One Hundred Years of Darkness. London: Pirogue, 2003. .
The Rape of a Nation. London: Mets and Schilt, 2009. .
The Unravelling. New York: FotoEvidence, 2015. .

Movies
 The Secret Life of Walter Mitty (2013) starring Ben Stiller. Included photographs by Bleasdale and members of VII Photo Agency.
 A Thousand Times Goodnight (2013) starring Juliet Binoche. Bleasdale was an advisor and had photographs included.

References

External links
 
'Rape of a Nation' by Bleasdale on MediaStorm
'Proof: Marcus Bleasdale on Shock and Change', National Geographic
'Shoot Stories', The Telegraph Magazine
'Capturing conflict mineral trade in DRC', TEDx Talks
'A visual journey into Africa', Bleasdale addresses The Skoll World Forum for Social Entrepreneurship
New York Times Lens Biography

War photographers
British photojournalists
1968 births
Living people